Evolutionary medicine or Darwinian medicine is the application of modern evolutionary theory to understanding health and disease.  Modern biomedical research and practice have focused on the molecular and physiological mechanisms underlying health and disease, while evolutionary medicine focuses on the question of why evolution has shaped these mechanisms in ways that may leave us susceptible to disease.  The evolutionary approach has driven important advances in the understanding of cancer, autoimmune disease, and anatomy. Medical schools have been slower to integrate evolutionary approaches because of limitations on what can be added to existing medical curricula. The International Society for Evolution, Medicine and Public Health coordinates efforts to develop the field. It owns the Oxford University Press journal Evolution, Medicine and Public Health and The Evolution and Medicine Review.

Core principles 
Utilizing the Delphi method, 56 experts from a variety of disciplines, including anthropology, medicine, nursing, and biology agreed upon 14 core principles intrinsic to the education and practice of evolutionary medicine.  These 14 principles can be further grouped into five general categories: question framing, evolution I and II (with II involving a higher level of complexity), evolutionary trade-offs, reasons for vulnerability, and culture.  Additional information regarding these principles may be found in the table below.

Human adaptations
Adaptation works within constraints, makes compromises and trade-offs, and occurs in the context of different forms of competition.

Constraints
Adaptations can only occur if they are evolvable. Some adaptations which would prevent ill health are therefore not possible.
 DNA cannot be totally prevented from undergoing somatic replication corruption; this has meant that cancer, which is caused by somatic mutations, has not (so far) been eliminated by natural selection.
 Humans cannot biosynthesize vitamin C, and so risk scurvy, vitamin C deficiency disease, if dietary intake of the vitamin is insufficient.
 Retinal neurons and their axon output have evolved to be inside the layer of retinal pigment cells. This creates a constraint on the evolution of the visual system such that the optic nerve is forced to exit the retina through a point called the optic disc. This, in turn, creates a blind spot. More importantly, it makes vision vulnerable to increased pressure within the eye (glaucoma) since this cups and damages the optic nerve at this point, resulting in impaired vision.
Other constraints occur as the byproduct of adaptive innovations.

Trade-offs and conflicts
One constraint upon selection is that different adaptations can conflict, which requires a compromise between them to ensure an optimal cost-benefit tradeoff.
 Running efficiency in women, and birth canal size
 Encephalization, and gut size 
 Skin pigmentation protection from UV, and the skin synthesis of vitamin D
 Speech and its use of a descended larynx, and increased risk of choking

Competition effects
Different forms of competition exist and these can shape the processes of genetic change.
 mate choice and disease susceptibility
 genomic conflict between mother and fetus that results in pre-eclampsia

Lifestyle
Humans evolved to live as simple hunter-gatherers in small tribal bands, while contemporary humans have a more complex life. This change may make present-day humans susceptible to lifestyle diseases.

Diet
In contrast to the diet of early hunter-gatherers, the modern Western diet often contains high quantities of fat, salt, and simple carbohydrates, such as refined sugars and flours.
 Trans fat health risks
 Dental caries
 High GI foods
 Modern diet based on "common wisdom" regarding diets in the paleolithic era

Among different countries, the incidence of colon cancer varies widely, and the extent of exposure to a Western pattern diet may be a factor in cancer incidence.

Life expectancy

Examples of aging-associated diseases are atherosclerosis and cardiovascular disease, cancer, arthritis, cataracts, osteoporosis, type 2 diabetes, hypertension and Alzheimer's disease. The incidence of all of these diseases increases rapidly with aging (increases exponentially with age, in the case of cancer). 

Of the roughly 150,000 people who die each day across the globe, about two thirds—100,000 per day—die of age-related causes. In industrialized nations, the proportion is much higher, reaching 90%.

Exercise
Many contemporary humans engage in little physical exercise compared to the physically active lifestyles of ancestral hunter-gatherers. Prolonged periods of inactivity may have only occurred in early humans following illness or injury, so a modern sedentary lifestyle may continuously cue the body to trigger life preserving metabolic and stress-related responses such as inflammation, and some theorize that this causes chronic diseases.

Cleanliness

Contemporary humans in developed countries are mostly free of parasites, particularly intestinal ones. This is  largely due to frequent washing of clothing and the body, and improved sanitation. Although such hygiene can be very important when it comes to maintaining good health, it can be problematic for the proper development of the immune system. The hygiene hypothesis is that humans evolved to be dependent on certain microorganisms that help establish the immune system, and modern hygiene practices can prevent necessary exposure to these microorganisms. "Microorganisms and macroorganisms such as helminths from mud, animals, and feces play a critical role in driving immunoregulation" (Rook, 2012). Essential microorganisms play a crucial role in building and training immune functions that fight off and repel some diseases, and protect against excessive inflammation, which has been implicated in several diseases. For instance, recent studies have found evidence supporting inflammation as a contributing factor in Alzheimer's Disease.

Specific explanations

This is a partial list: all links here go to a section describing or debating its evolutionary origin.

Life stage related

 Adipose tissue in human infants
 Arthritis and other chronic inflammatory diseases
 Ageing
 Alzheimer disease
 Childhood
 Menarche
 Menopause
 Menstruation
 Morning sickness

Other

 Atherosclerosis
 Arthritis and other chronic inflammatory diseases
Cough]
 Cystic fibrosis
 Dental occlusion
 Diabetes Type II
 Diarrhea
 Essential hypertension
 Fever
Gestational hypertension
 Gout
 Iron deficiency (paradoxical benefits)
 Obesity
 Phenylketonuria
 Placebos
 Osteoporosis
 Red blood cell polymorphism disorders
 Sickle cell anemia
 Sickness behavior
 Women's reproductive cancers

Evolutionary psychology

As noted in the table below, adaptationist hypotheses regarding the etiology of psychological disorders are often based on analogies with evolutionary perspectives on medicine and physiological dysfunctions (see in particular, Randy Nesse and George C. Williams' book Why We Get Sick).
Evolutionary psychiatrists and psychologists suggest that some mental disorders likely have multiple causes.

See several topic areas, and the associated references, below.

 Agoraphobia
 Anxiety
 Depression
 Drug abuse
 Schizophrenia
 Unhappiness

History

Charles Darwin did not discuss the implications of his work for medicine, though biologists quickly appreciated the germ theory of disease and its implications for understanding the evolution of pathogens, as well as an organism's need to defend against them.

Medicine, in turn, ignored evolution, and instead focused (as done in the hard sciences) upon proximate mechanical causes.

George C. Williams was the first to apply evolutionary theory to health in the context of senescence. Also in the 1950s, John Bowlby approached the problem of disturbed child development from an evolutionary perspective upon attachment.

An important theoretical development was Nikolaas Tinbergen's distinction made originally in ethology between evolutionary and proximate mechanisms.

Randolph M. Nesse summarizes its relevance to medicine: 

The paper of Paul Ewald in 1980, "Evolutionary Biology and the Treatment of Signs and Symptoms of Infectious Disease", and that of Williams and Nesse in 1991, "The Dawn of Darwinian Medicine" were key developments. The latter paper "draw a favorable reception",page x and led to a book, Why We Get Sick (published as Evolution and healing in the UK). In 2008, an online journal started: Evolution and Medicine Review.

See also 

 Evolutionary therapy
 Evolutionary psychiatry
 Evolutionary physiology
 Evolutionary psychology
 Evolutionary developmental psychopathology
 Evolutionary approaches to depression
 Illness
 Paleolithic lifestyle
 Universal Darwinism

References

Further reading 
Books

 
 
 
 
 
 

Online articles

External links 
 Evolution and Medicine Network
 Special Issue of Evolutionary Applications on Evolutionary Medicine

Evolutionary biology
Clinical medicine